Iron Maiden are a British heavy metal band, formed in 1975 by bassist and only original member Steve Harris, and since 1999, also consists of vocalist Bruce Dickinson, guitarists Dave Murray, Adrian Smith and Janick Gers, and drummer Nicko McBrain. The band have released seventeen studio albums: Iron Maiden (1980), Killers (1981), The Number of the Beast (1982), Piece of Mind (1983), Powerslave (1984), Somewhere in Time (1986), Seventh Son of a Seventh Son (1988), No Prayer for the Dying (1990), Fear of the Dark (1992), The X Factor (1995), Virtual XI (1998), Brave New World (2000), Dance of Death (2003), A Matter of Life and Death (2006), The Final Frontier (2010), The Book of Souls (2015) and Senjutsu (2021). As one of the most commercially successful heavy metal bands of all time, Iron Maiden have sold over 130 million albums worldwide. According to many sources all audio-visual releases of the band have sold in over 200 million copies worldwide, including regular albums, singles, VHS', DVDs and all compilations.

This article provides information on the awards given to the Iron Maiden group as a whole, as well as individual musicians from the period when they were artistically active members of the English formation. Iron Maiden and particular musicians of the band've received multiple nominations, honours and awards including Grammy Awards and equivalents awards in many countries, Brit Awards 2009, Silver Clef Award, Nordoff-Robbins Award, Ivor Novello Awards, Juno Awards, Top.HR Music Awards, Žebřík Music Awards, Public Choice International, Online Music Awards Germany, Classic Rock Roll of Honour Awards, Guinness Book of World Records, ECHO Awards, Honorary Doctorates, State Prizes, some of the biggest music magazines or festivals' honours, sales recognition, marketing achievements recognition awards, charity, film and sport awards among many others. Eight band's albums were honoured with unique Ampex Golden Reel Award. In 2005 Iron Maiden were inducted into Hollywood's RockWalk. The band is also a part of permanent exhibitions of the Rock and Roll Hall of Fame, Rock in Rio Wall of Fame and British Music Experience. Iron Maiden were hailed as the most successful British metal group on British Channel 4. Iron Maiden were honoured by EMI Records with a special plaque to memorize band's record sales. In 1996 it was given for 43 mln album sales and in 2008 the band was honoured for over 75 mln album sales. Band's mascot is a part of Rock Legends Wax Museum placed in Ontario. Since 2018 band mascot called Eddie the Head became a part of permanent exhibition of Wacken Hall of Fame.

In 1985 they were voted Number One Rock Act by international audience in Public Choice International, which was a unique honorary award given by an international audience, recognizing the number one rock act in many countries around the world. In 1989 Iron Maiden member – Bruce Dickinson received "The Razzie" in category The Worst Original Song for a single "Bring Your Daughter... to the Slaughter" which was a part of A Nightmare on Elm Street 5: The Dream Child original soundtrack and Maiden's No Prayer for the Dying album. Iron Maiden was apparently included in the Guinness Book Of World Records Museum in Las Vegas, NV. According to The Guinness book of Records (1990 ed. p. 155) In 1994, one of their singles, "Fear of the Dark", received a Grammy nomination for Best Metal Performance. Seven years later, the band were nominated again in that category, with the song "The Wicker Man". In 2011, Iron Maiden won the award with "El Dorado". In 2001, they won the Ivor Novello Award for international achievement. Iron Maiden received multiple nominations and awards from the Kerrang! Awards. In 1994 Steve Harris was awarded in category "Best Bassist Ever" and one year later he received prestigious "Kerrang! Kreativity Award", the band was nominated in category the "Best Live Act" in 2003, and were inducted into the Kerrang! Hall of Fame two years later. Overall, the band won seven from nine nominations. Metal Storm Awards is an annual awards ceremony held by Metal Storm, an Estonia-based heavy metal webzine. Since 2005 Iron Maiden received eight awards from ten nominations in multiple categories. Iron Maiden have also received fourteen awards from twenty two nominations at the Metal Hammer Golden Gods Awards and Paneuropean Metal Awards combined. Their mascot Eddie, who has previously been used by US critics to argue that Iron Maiden are Satanists, received a Golden Gods nomination in 2006, losing to singer Cristina Scabbia; but was awarded in 2008. Later in 2008, Iron Maiden were nominated in the Best Live Return category at the Vodafone Live Music Awards, to which the band disagreed with their nomination and asked to be withdrawn, stating that they were "not quite sure where we are returning from." They were replaced by the band James. Since 2006 Iron Maiden were four times nominated and awarded by Classic Rock as a part of Classic Rock Roll of Honour Awards. Band's musicians were awarded over eighty times from so same number of nominations in Japanese Burrn! Magazine annual awards.  Brazilian Rock Brigade magazine has been honoured Iron Maiden many times. Musicians were nominated and awarded 36 times in magazine's annual polls. So same we could say about German Rock Hard magazine which nominated and awarded British group multiple times.

The band were named "Best British Live Act" at the 2009 BRIT Awards, winning via a public poll. They were not able to attend the ceremony, ironically due to touring duties, instead delivering an acceptance message by video link-up. Their film Flight 666 won, in the category "24 Beats Per Second", at the SXSW film Festival, held in Austin, Texas, in March 2009. In 2009 band received an ECHO Award nomination for Best Live Band and finally won. Two years later, the musicians were nominated again in Best International Artist category. In 2016 Iron Maiden won the award with The Book of Souls album as the Best Rock/Alternative Album of 2015. In 2012 The Number of the Beast was voted as Best British Album Ever in the public poll related to Diamond Jubilee of Queen Elizabeth II the 60th anniversary of the accession. Iron Maiden were five times nominated and awarded in different categories by the greatest Polish radio network broadcasting all genres of rock music called Antyradio. The band has also received ten awards from fourteen nominations at the Planet Rock Awards (The ROCKS). They're nominated and awarded in 2016, 2017, 2018, 2019, 2021 and 2022 in multiple categories. In 2022 Iron Maiden became the most awarded band among the other artists. In 2019 the band visited Elon Musk's SPACEX where the Key Work Area was named after them and NASA's Mars Opportunity Rover soundtrack included Iron Maiden's hit song "The Trooper" as honouring the band.

Musicians were awarded in category Best International Live Performance as a part of Iberian Festival Awards. Annual Loudwire Awards were given to the public vote winners in multiple categories. Maiden have received three awards from four nominations. Band's drummer Nicko McBrain was inducted into Guitar Center's "Drum-Legends" Hall of Fame in 2009 and prestigious Modern Drummer Hall of Fame in 2020. In October 2021 McBrain was awarded in Slagwerkkrant poll vote as "The Best Drummer in the World Award". In February 2021 Iron Maiden were nominated for Rock and Roll Hall of Fame class. The second official nomination they received on the 1st February 2023. In April 2021 ex-members of the band were inducted into Metal Hall of Fame. The animated video for "The Writing on the Wall" single was nominated for UK Music Video Awards 2021 in category "Best Animation in a Video". In 2022 band's Senjutsu album was honored with the Top.HR Music Awards by The Croatian Discography Association and the Croatian branch of RTL in the "Bestselling International Album" category. The Top.HR Music Awards has been presented since 2020 and is the local equivalent of the Grammy. Particular musicians and Iron Maiden as the band were 61 times nominated to Žebřík Music Awards in the last 30 years. Žebřík Music Awards are the most popular music honors established in Czech Republic in 1992. The band's musicians were awarded ten times so far. The Cart and Horses Pub, located in Maryland Point, Stratford, was where Iron Maiden played some of their first shows in 1976. In 2010 the building was officially named "The Birthplace of Iron Maiden" as official museum-pub dedicated to the band's formation early years  (1975 – 1979). Iron Maiden's Legacy of the Beast World Tour 2018/19/22 was honored with commemorative CAA & K2 Award and the band receive another nomination for an annual Pollstar Awards. Iron Maiden were honoured by Royal Mail UK with dedicated postal stamps and cards. The band as 'bona fide' rock legends belongs to an elitarian circle of British iconic bands honoured with a unique range of stamps, including The Rolling Stones, The Beatles, Pink Floyd, Queen and Iron Maiden as the fifth one. By 2022 band's releases have been certified silver, gold and platinum around 600 times worldwide.

441 Room: Music Hall of Fame 
441 Room was an American independent media panel. Iron Maiden were inducted into "441 Room Music Hall of Fame" in 2011.

|-
| style="text-align:center;"| 2011 || Iron Maiden || Music Hall of Fame ||

Ampex Golden Reel Award
The Ampex Golden Reel Award was an international music award for studio albums and singles that were recorded and mixed entirely on Ampex audio tape, and which subsequently sold enough units to achieve gold record status in its country of origin.

|-
| style="text-align:center;"| 1981 || Killers
|| Ampex Golden Reel Award || 
|-
| style="text-align:center;"| 1983 || Piece of Mind
|| Ampex Golden Reel Award || 
|-
| style="text-align:center;"| 1984 || Powerslave
|| Ampex Golden Reel Award || 
|-
| style="text-align:center;"| 1985 || Live After Death
|| Ampex Golden Reel Award || 
|-
| style="text-align:center;"| 1986 || Somewhere in Time
|| Ampex Golden Reel Award || 
|-
| style="text-align:center;"| 1988 || Seventh Son of a Seventh Son
|| Ampex Golden Reel Award ||
|-
| style="text-align:center;"| 1990 || No Prayer for the Dying
|| Ampex Golden Reel Award|| 
|-
| style="text-align:center;"| 1992 || Fear of the Dark
|| Ampex Golden Reel Award||

Argentina Music Industry Award
Sales Recognition Award Iron Maiden for well over one million albums sold in Argentina.

|-
| style="text-align:center;"| 2019 || Iron Maiden || Sales Recognition Award ||

ARIA Award
Record Sales Recognition Award given to Iron Maiden for well over one million albums sold in Australia.

|-
| style="text-align:center;"| 2011 || Iron Maiden || Sales Recognition Award ||

Bandit Rock Awards
The Bandit Rock Awards are an annual ceremony held by the Swedish radio station of the same name. Iron Maiden have received six awards.

|-
| style="text-align:center;"| 2005 || Iron Maiden || Best International Live Act || 
|-
| style="text-align:center;"| 2006 || A Matter of Life and Death || Best International Album || 
|-
| style="text-align:center;"| 2011 || Iron Maiden || Best International Live Act || 
|-
| style="text-align:center;"| 2015 || Iron Maiden || Best International Live Act || 
|-
| style="text-align:center;"| 2016 || The Book of Souls || Best International Album || 
|-
| style="text-align:center;"| 2016 || Iron Maiden || Best International Live Act ||

Bass Player
Best Gear Award for TECH 21 NYC Steve Harris Signature Sansamp.

|-
| style="text-align:center;"| 2021 || Steve Harris || Best Gear Award ||

BBC Radio Awards
The British Broadcasting Corporation (BBC) is the national broadcaster of the United Kingdom. The BBC is established under a royal charter and operates under its agreement with the secretary of state for digital, culture, media and sport. The original radio programs of Bruce Dickinson have been awarded several times by listeners. Iron Maiden as a band were honoured two times.

|-
| style="text-align:center;"| 2002 || Bruce Dickinson || Best Music DJ Sony Award || 
|-
| style="text-align:center;"| 2005||"Bring Your Daughter... to the Slaughter"|| Best UK Single Ever || 
|-
| style="text-align:center;"| 2006|| Bruce Dickinson || Best Rock Programm || 
|-
| style="text-align:center;"| 2008 || Bruce Dickinson || Golden Rock Mike || 
|-
| style="text-align:center;"| 2009 || Iron Maiden ||Greatest Metal Band Of All Time|| 
|-
| style="text-align:center;"| 2010 || Bruce Dickinson || Best Author's Programm ||

Bogota International Airport
An Honorary Capitan Title for Bruce Dickinson.

|-
| style="text-align:center;"| 2009 || Bruce Dickinson || Honorary Capitan Title ||

BRIT Awards
The BRIT Awards are the British Phonographic Industry's annual pop music awards. Iron Maiden have received one award from two nominations.

|-
| style="text-align:center;"| 1992 || "Bring Your Daughter... to the Slaughter" || Best British Single || 
|-
| style="text-align:center;"| 2009 || Iron Maiden || Best British Live Act ||

British Bottlers Institute
Founded in 1953, the British Bottlers' Institute has long been a crucial supporter to the bottling and packaging industry. Iron Maiden's beer called Trooper Ale was many times awarded with the gold medal be this institution.

|-
| style="text-align:center;"| 2014 || Iron Maiden's Trooper Ale || Gold Medal Beer || 
|-
| style="text-align:center;"| 2016 || Iron Maiden's Trooper Ale || Gold Medal Beer || 
|-
| style="text-align:center;"| 2018|| Iron Maiden's Trooper Ale || Gold Medal Beer ||

British Channel 4
Iron Maiden were hailed as the most successful British metal group on British Channel 4.

|-
| style="text-align:center;"| 2000 || Iron Maiden || The Most Successful British Metal Group ||

British Drum Co.
In 2019 Nicko McBrain was honoured by British Drum Co. with the "International Brand Ambassador" title.

|-
| style="text-align:center;"| 2018 || Nicko McBrain || International Brand Ambassador ||

British Drum Icons
MikeDolbear.com was established in November 2000 with the philosophy to use the power of the internet to bring the drumming community together. Mike Dolbear has become a motivator and educator recognised globally throughout the drumming world and today his passion and commitment continues to push the boundaries. British Drum Icons became an institution gathering together the brightest phenomenons in the music world of drumming. In 2005 Nicko McBrain was inducted into the BDI Hall of Fame and three years later he was awarded with Best Metal Drummer title. 

|-
| style="text-align:center;"| 2005 || Nicko McBrain || BDI Hall of Fame || 
|-
| style="text-align:center;"| 2008 || Nicko McBrain || Best Metal Drummer ||

British Music Experience
The British Music Experience is a permanent exhibition in the Cunard Building on Liverpool's waterfront. It began as an exhibition, taking up more than 20,000 square feet, installed into The O2 Bubble, part of The O2 in Greenwich, London. In 2011 Iron Maiden were honoured by the Flight 666 Exhibition which was held in London In 2017 band's mascot Eddie the Head became a part of permanent exhibition as "Icon Presentation" in the Cunard Building on Liverpool's waterfront.

|-
| style="text-align:center;"| 2011 ||Flight 666 Exposition (London)|| Special Exhibition || 
|-
| style="text-align:center;"| 2017 || Eddie the Head Icon Presentation || Permanent Exposition ||

Brussels Beer Challenge
The Brussels Beer Challenge is an annual international beer competition.

|-
| style="text-align:center;"| 2020|| Trooper Brasil IPA || Silver Medal Beer ||

Burrn! Awards
Burrn! is the biggest and the most popular hard rock and heavy metal magazine in Japan. Iron Maiden were awarded over eighty times from so same number of nominations in Burrn! Magazine annual awards: 

|-
| style="text-align:center;"|1985||Iron Maiden||The First Year Poll Winner|| 
|-
| style="text-align:center;"|1985||Iron Maiden||Best International Band|| 
|-
| style="text-align:center;"|1985||Iron Maiden||Best Live Band|| 
|-
| style="text-align:center;"|1985||Bruce Dickinson||Best Vocalist|| 
|-
| style="text-align:center;"|1985||Steve Harris||Best Bass Player|| 
|-
| style="text-align:center;"|1985||Steve Harris||Best Songwriter|| 
|-
| style="text-align:center;"|1985||Nicko McBrain||Best Drummer|| 
|-
| style="text-align:center;"|1985||Powerslave||Best Album|| 
|-
| style="text-align:center;"|1985||Powerslave||Best Sleeve Illustration || 
|-
| style="text-align:center;"|1986||Steve Harris||Best Bass player|| 
|-
| style="text-align:center;"|1986||Live After Death||Best Sleeve Illustration|| 
|-
| style="text-align:center;"|1986||Iron Maiden||Best Live Band|| 
|-
| style="text-align:center;"|1987||Iron Maiden||Best International Band|| 
|-
| style="text-align:center;"|1987||Iron Maiden||Best Metal Band of All Time|| 
|-
| style="text-align:center;"|1987||Iron Maiden||Best Live Band|| 
|-
| style="text-align:center;"|1987||Somewhere in Time||Best Sleeve Illustration|| 
|-
| style="text-align:center;"|1987||Bruce Dickinson||Best Vocalist|| 
|-
| style="text-align:center;"|1987||Steve Harris||Best Bass Player|| 
|-
| style="text-align:center;"|1989||Steve Harris||Best Bassist|| 
|-
| style="text-align:center;"|1989||Iron Maiden||Best Metal Band of All Time|| 
|-
| style="text-align:center;"|1991||Steve Harris||Best Bassist|| 
|-
| style="text-align:center;"|1991||Iron Maiden||Best Live Band|| 
|-
| style="text-align:center;"|1992||Steve Harris ||Best Bassist|| 
|-
| style="text-align:center;"|1992||Fear of the Dark||Best Album Sleeve Illustration|| 
|-
| style="text-align:center;"|1993||Steve Harris ||Best Bassist|| 
|-
| style="text-align:center;"|1993||Bruce Dickinson||Best Vocalist|| 
|-
| style="text-align:center;"|1994||Bruce Dickinson||Heavy Metal Icon|| 
|-
| style="text-align:center;"|1996||Steve Harris||Best Bassist|| 
|-
| style="text-align:center;"|1996||The X Factor||Best Album|| 
|-
| style="text-align:center;"|1998||Steve Harris||Best Bassist|| 
|-
| style="text-align:center;"|2001||Steve Harris||Best Bassist|| 
|-
| style="text-align:center;"|2001||Nicko McBrain ||2nd Best Drummer|| 
|-
| style="text-align:center;"|2001||Kevin Shirley ||2nd Best Producer|| 
|-
| style="text-align:center;"|2001||Bruce Dickinson||Heavy Metal Icon|| 
|-
| style="text-align:center;"|2001||Bruce Dickinson||2nd Best Vocalist|| 
|-
| style="text-align:center;"|2001||Brave New World|| Redactors' Choice Album || 
|-
| style="text-align:center;"|2001||Brave New World||Best Album|| 
|-
| style="text-align:center;"|2001||Brave New World||Best Album Cover|| 
|-
| style="text-align:center;"|2001||Iron Maiden||Best Group International|| 
|-
| style="text-align:center;"|2001||Iron Maiden||Redactors' Choice Band|| 
|-
| style="text-align:center;"|2001||Iron Maiden||Best Live Band|| 
|-
| style="text-align:center;"|2004||Steve Harris||Best Bassist|| 
|-
| style="text-align:center;"|2004||Nicko McBrain ||2nd Best Drummer|| 
|-
| style="text-align:center;"|2004||Iron Maiden||Best Live Band|| 
|-
| style="text-align:center;"|2004||Bruce Dickinson|| Best Vocalist|| 
|-
| style="text-align:center;"|2004||Dance of Death|| Redactors' Choice Album || 
|-
| style="text-align:center;"|2006||Steve Harris||Best Bassist|| 
|-
| style="text-align:center;"|2006||Steve Harris||Best Composer|| 
|-
| style="text-align:center;"|2006||"Different World"||Best Tune|| 
|-
| style="text-align:center;"|2006||"Reincarnation of Benjamin Breeg"||2nd Best Tune|| 
|-
| style="text-align:center;"|2006||Bruce Dickinson||Best Vocalist|| 
|-
| style="text-align:center;"|2006||A Matter of Life and Death|| Redactors' Choice Album|| 
|-
| style="text-align:center;"|2006||A Matter of Life and Death||Best Album|| 
|-
| style="text-align:center;"|2006||A Matter of Life and Death||Best Album Cover|| 
|-
| style="text-align:center;"|2006||Iron Maiden||Best Group International|| 
|-
| style="text-align:center;"|2006||Iron Maiden||Redactors' Choice Band|| 
|-
| style="text-align:center;"|2006||Iron Maiden||Redactors' Choice Best Live Performance|| 
|-
| style="text-align:center;"|2008||Steve Harris ||Best Bassist|| 
|-
| style="text-align:center;"|2008||Steve Harris||Best Composer|| 
|-
| style="text-align:center;"|2008||Iron Maiden||Best Live Band|| 
|-
| style="text-align:center;"|2009||Steve Harris ||Best Bassist|| 
|-
| style="text-align:center;"|2009||Iron Maiden||Best Tour|| 
|-
| style="text-align:center;"|2011||Steve Harris ||Best Bassist|| 
|-
| style="text-align:center;"|2011||Iron Maiden||Best Tour|| 
|-
| style="text-align:center;"|2011||The Final Frontier||Best Album|| 
|-
| style="text-align:center;"|2016||Steve Harris ||Best Bassist|| 
|-
| style="text-align:center;"|2016||Steve Harris||Best Composer|| 
|-
| style="text-align:center;"|2016||Nicko McBrain||Best Drummer|| 
|-
| style="text-align:center;"|2016||"Speed of Light"||Best Tune|| 
|-
| style="text-align:center;"|2016||Bruce Dickinson||Best Vocalist|| 
|-
| style="text-align:center;"|2016||The Book of Souls||Redactors' Choice Album|| 
|-
| style="text-align:center;"|2016||The Book of Souls||Best Album|| 
|-
| style="text-align:center;"|2016||Smith/Murray||Best Guitarist|| 
|-
| style="text-align:center;"|2016||Iron Maiden||Best Group International|| 
|-
| style="text-align:center;"|2016||Iron Maiden||Redactors' Choice Band|| 
|-
| style="text-align:center;"|2016||Iron Maiden||Redactors' Choice Best Live Performance|| 
|-
| style="text-align:center;"|2019||Steve Harris||Best Bassist|| 
|-
| style="text-align:center;"|2019||Iron Maiden||Redactors' Choice Best Live Performance|| 
|-
| style="text-align:center;"|2020||Steve Harris||Best Bass Player Ever|| 
|-
| style="text-align:center;"|2022||Iron Maiden||Redactors' Choice Band|| 
|-
| style="text-align:center;"|2022||Steve Harris||Best Bassist|| 
|-
| style="text-align:center;"|2022||Steve Harris||Best Composer|| 
|-
| style="text-align:center;"|2022||Senjutsu||Album of the Year|| 
|-
| style="text-align:center;"|2022||Senjutsu||Best Album's Cover||

Butantan Institute Sao Paulo
Extraordinarius brucedickinsoni a brand new species of Brazilian spider named after frontman of Iron Maiden

|-
| style="text-align:center;"| 2019 || Bruce Dickinson || Extraordinarius brucedickinsoni  ||

CAA & K2 Award
An award disc on behalf of Iron Maiden from their agents CAA (N.America) and K2 (Rest Of World) commemorating the amazing achievement of well over 3 million tickets sold on the Legacy of the Beast Tour 2018/19/22.

|-
| style="text-align:center;"| 2022 || Legacy of the Beast World Tour || Commemorative Award Disc||

CAERDAV
CAERDAV provides maintenance, repair and overhaul (MRO), and training services, for airlines across the world. Since 2018 Bruce Dickinson is the chairman and owner of this aviation company. 

|-
| style="text-align:center;"| 2018 || Bruce Dickinson || Chairman and the owner||

Classic Album Series
Classic Albums is a British documentary series about pop, rock and heavy metal albums that are considered the best or most distinctive of a well-known band or musician or that exemplify a stage in the history of music. In 2001 Iron Maiden's ground-breaking The Number of the Beast album became the part of series.

|-
| style="text-align:center;"| 2001 ||The Number of the Beast || Classic Album Series||

Classic of Rock Award 
The German charity award received by popular artist who support independent activity.

|-
| style="text-align:center;"| 1992 || Iron Maiden || Good, Gold, Platinum Charity ||

Classic Rock Roll of Honour Awards
Since 2006 Iron Maiden were four times nominated and awarded by Classic Rock as a part of Classic Rock Roll of Honour Awards.

|-
| style="text-align:center;"| 2006 || A Matter of Life and Death||Album of the Year || 
|-
| style="text-align:center;"| 2006 ||Rod Smallwood||VIP Award|| 
|-
| style="text-align:center;"| 2009||Iron Maiden||Band of the Year ||  
|-
| style="text-align:center;"| 2015||The Book of Souls||Album of the Year ||  
|}

Colombian Cultural Award
In 2008 Iron maiden were honored by Colombian Ministry of Culture with "The Biggest Cultural Event Award" for band's show held at Simon Bolivar Park in Bogota.

|-
| style="text-align:center;"| 2008 || Iron Maiden || Cultural Event of the Year ||

Congress of Argentina Honours
An Argentine State Prize awarded to Iron Maiden musicians for their contribution to the development of the country's culture and music. Awarded for the first time in history to a foreign artist.

|-
| style="text-align:center;"| 2019||Iron Maiden|| Relief Salon De Los Pasos Perdidos ||

CRIA Award
Canadian Recording Industry Association sales recognition award for one and a half million albums sold in Canada. The award was received by the band in February 1987.

|-
| style="text-align:center;"| 1987 || Iron Maiden || Sales Recognition Award ||

Dot Music Awards 
Dot Music Awards was an award granted to the best or the most interestingly constructed websites dedicated to various forms of activity.

|-
| style="text-align:center;"| 1998 || Iron Maiden || Best Music Website ||

ECHO Award
Echo Music Prize (stylised as ECHO, German pronunciation: [ˈɛço]) was an accolade by the Deutsche Phono-Akademie [de], an association of recording companies of Germany to recognize outstanding achievement in the music industry. In 2009 band received an ECHO Award nomination for Best Live Band and finally won. Two years later, the musicians were nominated again in Best International Artist category. In 2016 Iron Maiden won the award with The Book of Souls album as the Best Rock/Alternative Album of 2015.

|-
| style="text-align:center;"| 2009 || rowspan="3"| Iron Maiden || Best Live Artist|| 
|-
| style="text-align:center;"| 2011 || Best International Artist||  
|-
| style="text-align:center;"| 2016|| Best Rock/Alternative Album ||  
|}

Edinburgh Odeon Award
In 1981 the band received an award from local live events management for the fastest selling show at Edinburgh Odeon.

|-
| style="text-align:center;"| 1981 || Iron Maiden || Fastest Selling Show||

El Salvador Ministry of Tourism
Honorary Visitors of the Country Award founded by the Ministry of Tourism in El Salvador and for the very first time given to the music group.

|-
| style="text-align:center;"| 2016 || Iron Maiden || Honorary Visitors Award ||

EMI Rec. Sales Award
Iron Maiden were honoured by EMI Records with a special plaque to memorize band's record sales. In 1996 it was given for 43 mln album sales and in 2008 the band was honoured for over 75 mln album sales.

|-
| style="text-align:center;"| 1996 || Iron Maiden || Record Sales Award || 
|-
| style="text-align:center;"| 2008 || Iron Maiden || Record Sales Award ||

Emma-gaala
The Emma-gaala is an annual music awards ceremony established in 1983 by the Suomen Ääni- ja kuvatallennetuottajat. Iron Maiden have received three awards.

|-
| style="text-align:center;"| 2004 || rowspan="3"| Iron Maiden || rowspan="2"| Yleisöäänestys – Vuoden ulkomainen artisti(The audience vote – for a foreign artist) || 
|-
| style="text-align:center;"| 2006 || 
|-
| style="text-align:center;"| 2008 || Best Live Artist|| 
|}

Eriogonum fasciculatum "Bruce Dickinson"
California buckwheat named after Iron Maiden's frontman: Eriogonum fasciculatum "Bruce Dickinson".

|-
| style="text-align:center;"| 2018 || Bruce Dickinson || Eriogonum fasciculatum "Bruce Dickinson"||

EQII Diamond Jubilee 
Public poll vote related to Diamond Jubilee of Queen Elizabeth II the 60th anniversary of the accession.

|-
| style="text-align:center;"| 2012 || The Number of the Beast || Best British Album Ever ||

EVENT.DE Golden Award
In 2004 Iron Maiden received a very special Golden Award from EVENT.de for the best sound system used on their German 2003 tour.

|-
| style="text-align:center;"| 2004 || Iron Maiden || Best Sound System||

Fonogram - Magyar Zenei Díjat
The Senjutsu album was nominated for Fonogram - Magyar Zenei Díjat, the Hungarian equivalent of the Grammy, in the category "Best Hard Rock / Metal Album".

|-
| style="text-align:center;"| 2022||Senjutsu||Best Hard Rock/Metal Album||

Forca Jovem Vasco
Forca Jovem Vasco is a youth sports club from São Paulo, whose mascot is Eddie the Head, known from the covers of Iron Maiden.

|-
| style="text-align:center;"| 2000|| EDDIE (Iron Maiden)
|| Honorary Mascot of the Club ||

Global Beer Masters
Worldwide beer and wine competitions.

|-
| style="text-align:center;"| 2019 || Trooper Light Brigade || Silver Award || 
|-
| style="text-align:center;"| 2020 || Iron Maiden's Trooper || Gold Award ||

GMA Awards
Global Metal Apocalypse (GMA) is an international, independent society of heavy metal readers, journalists and musicians who support the metal music overseas. Iron Maiden's seventeenth studio album was awarded as "The Best Release of the 2021".

|-
| style="text-align:center;"| 2022 ||"Senjutsu"||The Best Release of the 2021||

Grammy Awards
The annual Grammy Awards are presented by the National Academy of Recording Arts and Sciences. Iron Maiden have received one award from five nominations.

|-
| style="text-align:center;"|  || "Fear of the Dark" (from A Real Live One)|| rowspan="2"| Best Metal Performance || 
|-
| style="text-align:center;"rowspan="2"|||"The Wicker Man" || 
|-
| style="text-align:left;|"The Wicker Man"||Best Metal Single|| 
|-
| style="text-align:center;"|  || "El Dorado" ||Best Metal Performance|| 
|-
| style="text-align:center;"|  || "Blood Brothers" (from En Vivo!)|| Best Hard Rock/Metal Performance  ||

Greece IFPI Award
Sales Recognition Award for well over half a million albums sold in Greece.

|-
| style="text-align:center;"| 2018 || Iron Maiden || Sales Recognition Award||

Guinness Book of World Records 
Iron Maiden was apparently included in the Guinness Book of World Records Museum in Las Vegas, NV. According to The Guinness book of Records (1990 ed. p. 155): "Largest PA system: On Aug 20th 1988 at the Castle Donington 'Monsters of Rock' Festival a total of 360 Turbosound cabinets offering a potential 523kW of programme power, formed the largest front-of-house PA. The average Sound Pressure Level at the mixing tower was 118dB, peaking at a maximum of 124dB during Iron Maiden's set. It took five days to set up the system." Iron Maiden fans and collectors were included in Guinness Book of Records with their record breaking achievements as well. In 2012 Rasmus Stavnsborg (Denmark), in Karlslunde, Denmark – Iron Maiden items collector was included in the book for "The Largest Collection of Iron Maiden Memorabilia" of 4,168 items. Once again he was included in 2014 with 4,507 items. Marco Motolo (Brasil) in 2013 was the person with "The Biggest Number of Tattoos Dedicated" to the One Artist: Iron Maiden including 172 tattoos. In 2022 an American online music magazine Loudwire listed Iron Maiden among "10 Bands to Broke World Records". As the magazine mentioned in 2016, the band was included in the Guinness Book of World Records for "Most Difficult Song in Rock Band Game" which was band's hit single "Run to the Hills". A year later, thay were included in the book once again for "Most Songs Featured in Videogames by Metal Artist", which meant 51 tracks in 15 games as it was listed on 30 March 2017.

|-
| style="text-align:center;"| 1990 || Iron Maiden || Largest PA system || 
|-
| style="text-align:center;"| 2012 || Rasmus Stavnsborg || Largest Items Collection || 
|-
| style="text-align:center;"| 2013|| Marco Motolo || The Biggest Number of Tattoos || 
|-
| style="text-align:center;"| 2014 || Rasmus Stavnsborg || Largest Items Collection || 
|-
| style="text-align:center;"| 2016|| Iron Maiden || Most Difficult Song in Rock Band Game || 
|-
| style="text-align:center;"| 2017 || Iron Maiden || Most Songs Featured in Videogames by Metal Artist ||

Guitar Center's Drum-Legends Hall of Fame
Nicko McBrain was inducted into Guitar Center's "Drum-Legends" Hall of Fame on Saturday, January 10, 2009, at Guitar Center's Drum-Off grand finals in Los Angeles. McBrain also performed the band's classics "The Trooper" and "Hallowed Be Thy Name" at the event, which was held at the historic Music Box at Fonda Theater.

|-
| style="text-align:center;"| 2009 || Nicko McBrain || Hall of Fame Inducted ||

Hit Parader
Hit Parader was an American music magazine that operated between 1942 and 2008. A monthly publication, it focused on rock and pop music in general until the 1970s, when its focus began turning to hard rock and heavy metal. In 1985 Iron Maiden were voted and finally announced "The Loudest Band in the World" and in 1988 band were induted into magazine's "Heavy Metal Hall of Fame". In 2006 Iron Maiden were inducted into Hit Parader "Hard & Heavy Hall Of Fame".

|-
| style="text-align:center;"| 1985 || Iron Maiden || The Loudest Band in the World || 
|-
| style="text-align:center;"| 1988 || Iron Maiden || Heavy Metal Hall of Fame || 
|-
| style="text-align:center;"| 2006 || Iron Maiden || Hard & Heavy Hall Of Fame ||

Hollywood's RockWalk
On 19 August 2005 Iron Maiden were inducted into Hollywood's RockWalk.

|-
| style="text-align:center;"| 2005 || Iron Maiden || Hollywood's RockWalk ||

Honorary Citizen of Sarayevo
An honorary citizen title is awarded to a particularly important person/artist/politician by the government or municipal council of the state.

|-
| style="text-align:center;"| 2018|| Bruce Dickinson|| Honorary Citizen Title ||

Honorary Visitors of Asuncion Diploma
An honorary visitor title is awarded to a particularly important person/artist/politician by the government or municipal council of the state.

|-
| style="text-align:center;"| 2013||Iron Maiden|| Asuncion Keys to the City ||

Honorary Visitors of BSBA Diploma
An honorary visitor title is awarded to a particularly important person/artist/politician by the government or municipal council of the state.

|-
| style="text-align:center;"| 2013||Iron Maiden|| Buenos Aires Keys to the City ||

Iberian Festival Awards
Iberian Festival Awards recognizes the contributions and achievements of the event organizers and all the other players in the festivals. Iron Maiden were awarded in category Best International Live Performance.

|-
| style="text-align:center;"| 2017 || Iron Maiden || Best International Live Performance ||

Ivor Novello Awards
The Ivor Novello Awards are presented annually in London by the British Academy of Composers and Songwriters. Iron Maiden have received one award.

|-
| style="text-align:center;"| 2001 || Iron Maiden || International Achievement ||

IFPI Finland Award
Two Sales Recognition Awards from Finland. In 2005 band's record sales trespassed half a million copies. In 2010 Iron Maiden's records were sold in over 750,000 copies.

|-
| style="text-align:center;"| 2005 || Iron Maiden || Sales Recognition Award|| 
|-
| style="text-align:center;"| 2010 || Iron Maiden || Sales Recognition Award||

Intelligent Life magazine
In 2009 Bruce Dickinson was honoured with the "Official Polymath Title" by Intelligent Life.

|-
| style="text-align:center;"| 2009 || Bruce Dickinson || Official Polymath Title ||

International Brewing and Cider Awards
The competition, which dates back to 1886, has a long history of championing the world's best brewers and cider-makers, and the competition's unique approach to the judging process sets it apart from other awards, earning it the reputation as the "Oscars of the brewing and cider world". Trooper IPA – created by rock legends Iron Maiden and Robinsons, is a 4.3% ABV golden India Pale Ale which was awarded Silver in the category of Ales and also Trooper Ale received Bronze Award.

|-
| style="text-align:center;"| 2021 || Trooper IPA || Bronze Award || 
|-
| style="text-align:center;"| 2021 || Trooper Ale || Silver Award ||

Iron Maiden Day
The mayor of Albuquerque proclaimed the 19th September as "Iron Maiden Day". 

|-
| style="text-align:center;"| 2019 || Iron Maiden || 19 September "Iron Maiden Day"||

Juno Awards
The Juno Awards are presented by the Canadian Academy of Recording Arts and Sciences. Iron Maiden have received one award.

|-
| align="center"|  || Iron Maiden: Flight 666 || Music DVD of the Year ||

KEF Award
KEF is a British loudspeaker manufacturer with international distribution. In 2004 band's album Dance of Death re-released as DVD Audio Disc was awarded in category "Best Sounding DVD Audio". 

|-
| style="text-align:center;"| 2004 || Dance of Death DVD Audio || Sounding DVD Audio ||

Kerrang! Awards
The Kerrang! Awards is an annual awards ceremony held by Kerrang!, a British rock magazine. Iron Maiden have received seven awards from nine nominations.

|-
| style="text-align:center;"| 1994 || Steve Harris || Best Bassist Ever || 
|-
| style="text-align:center;"| 1995 || Steve Harris || Kreativity Award || 
|-
| style="text-align:center;"| 2003 || Iron Maiden || Best Live Act || 
|-
| style="text-align:center;"| 2005 || Iron Maiden || Kerrang! Hall of Fame || 
|-
| style="text-align:center;"| 2008 || Iron Maiden || Kerrang! Icon || 
|-
| style="text-align:center;"| 2012 || Iron Maiden || Best British Band || 
|-
| style="text-align:center;"| 2013 || Iron Maiden || Kerrang! Inspiration || 
|-
| style="text-align:center;"| 2016 || Iron Maiden || Kerrang! Legend || 
|-
| style="text-align:center;"| 2018 || Iron Maiden || Best Live Act||

Loudwire Awards
Loudwire is an American online magazine that covers hard rock and heavy metal music. Annual Loudwire Awards were given to the public vote winners in multiple categories. Maiden have received three awards from four nominations.

|-
| style="text-align:center;"| 2016 || Bruce Dickinson || Best Vocalist || 
|-
| style="text-align:center;"| 2017 || Iron Maiden || Best Live Act || 
|-
| style="text-align:center;"| 2017 || Iron Maiden || UK Band || 
|-
| style="text-align:center;"| 2017 || Steve Harris || Bassist of the Year ||

Madame Tussaud's Rock Circus
In 1996 Iron Maiden were inducted into Madame Tussaud's Rock Circus, a walk-through exhibition celebrating the history of rock and pop music, featuring its major figures recreated in wax. It was located at the top four floors of the then-newly refurbished London Pavilion building at Piccadilly Circus, London. Madame Tussaud's Rock Circus was closed in 2001.

|-
| style="text-align:center;"| 1996||Iron Maiden||Madame Tussaud's Rock Circus||

Matwatches France
In 2020 Bruce Dickinson became an Honorary Brand Ambassador for Matwatches France. 

|-
| style="text-align:center;"| 2020 || Bruce Dickinson || Matwaches France Ambassador||

Metal Hall of Fame
Metal Hall of Fame honorary induction is an annual ceremony which takes place in the United States. The ex - Iron Maiden members (Paul Di'Anno, Blaze Bayley, Derek Riggs) have received the very first nomination and were inducted in April 2021.

|-
| style="text-align:center;"| 2021 || Iron Maiden ex-Members || Metal Hall of Fame Inducted||

Metal Hammer DE Awards
Metal Hammer Deutschland is German edition of hard rock & heavy metal magazine Metal Hammer.

|-
| style="text-align:center;"| 2009||Iron Maiden|| Best International Band || 
|-
| style="text-align:center;"| 2010||Iron Maiden|| Best Live Band ||

Metal Hammer Golden Gods Awards
The Metal Hammer Golden Gods Awards is an annual awards ceremony held by Metal Hammer, a British heavy metal magazine. Iron Maiden have received fourteen awards from twenty two nominations at the Metal Hammer Golden Gods Awards and Paneuropean Metal Awards combined.

|-
| style="text-align:center;" rowspan="6"| 1991 || Iron Maiden || The Greatest Metal Band Ever || 
|-
| Steve Harris || Best Bassist Ever || 
|-
| Bruce Dickinson || Best Frontman Ever || 
|-
| Eddie the Head || Heavy Metal Icon || 
|-
| Nicko McBrain || Best Drummer || 
|-
| Dave Murray || Best Drummer || 
|-
| style="text-align:center;" | 2004 ||Iron Maiden || Best UK Act || 
|-
| style="text-align:center;" rowspan="2"| 2006 || Nicko McBrain || Best Drummer || 
|-
| Eddie the Head || Icon || 
|-
| style="text-align:center;" rowspan="3"| 2007 || Iron Maiden || Best UK Band || 
|-
| Janick Gers, Adrian Smith, Dave Murray || Riff Lord || 
|-
| A Matter of Life and Death || Album of the Year || 
|-
| style="text-align:center;" rowspan="2"| 2008 || Iron Maiden || Best UK Band || 
|-
| Eddie the Head || Icon Award || 
|-
| style="text-align:center;" rowspan="2"| 2009 || Iron Maiden || Best UK Band || 
|-
| Iron Maiden || Golden God || 
|-
| style="text-align:center;"| 2011 || Iron Maiden || Best UK Band || 
|-
| style="text-align:center;"| 2012 || Iron Maiden's UK Tour || Best Event || 
|-
| style="text-align:center;"| 2014 || Iron Maiden || Best UK Band || 
|-
| style="text-align:center;"| 2016 || The Book of Souls || Best Album|| 
|-
| style="text-align:center;"| 2017 || Iron Maiden: Legacy of the Beast || Best Game ||

Metal Storm Awards
Metal Storm Awards is an annual awards ceremony held by Metal Storm, an Estonia-based heavy metal webzine. Since 2005 Iron Maiden received eight awards from ten nominations in multiple categories.    

|-
| style="text-align:center;"| 2005 || EggFest Sharon Osbourne vs. Iron Maiden || Best Drama Award || 
|-
| style="text-align:center;"| 2006 || A Matter of Life and Death || Best Heavy Metal Album Award|| 
|-
| style="text-align:center;"| 2009 || Iron Maiden: Flight 666 || Best DVD Award || 
|-
| style="text-align:center;"| 2010 || Iron Maiden: Flight 666 || Best DVD of Decade Award || 
|-
| style="text-align:center;"| 2010 || "The Final Frontier" || Best Video Award || 
|-
| style="text-align:center;"| 2021 || "The Writing on the Wall" || Best Video Award || 
|-
| style="text-align:center;"| 2021 || Senjutsu || Heavy/Melodic Metal Album Award || 
|-
| style="text-align:center;"| 2021 || Senjutsu || The Biggest Letdown Award ||

Modern Drummer Hall of Fame
Modern Drummer is the world's #1 drumming resource since 1977. Nicko McBrain was inducted into prestigious Modern Drummer Hall of Fame in 2020.

|-
| style="text-align:center;"| 2020 || Nicko McBrain || Hall of Fame Inducted ||

Music Life Japan
Iron Maiden were honoured by Music Life Japanese magazine in 1980, 1982 and 1983.

|-
| style="text-align:center;"| 1980 || Iron Maiden || Best Newcomer || 
|-
| style="text-align:center;"| 1982 || Iron Maiden || Best Live Band || 
|-
| style="text-align:center;"| 1983 || The Number of the Beast || Best Rock Album ||

Music Radar Awards
Nicko McBrain was nominated in category Best Metal Drummer 2021. Iron Maiden guitar trio (Adrian Smith, Janick Gers, Dave Murray) was nominated in category Best Metal Guitarist 2021.

|-
| style="text-align:center;"| 2021 || Nicko McBrain ||Best Metal Drummer || 
|-
| style="text-align:center;"| 2021 || Guitar Trio ||Best Metal Guitarist||

NASA Mars Opportunity Rover
NASA's Mars Opportunity Rover soundtrack included Iron Maiden's hit song "The Trooper" as honouring the band.

|-
| style="text-align:center;"| 2019 || The Trooper || Mars Opportunity Rover Soundtrack ||

Nordoff-Robbins Award
In 2004 Iron Maiden received Nordoff-Robbins Award for Special Achievement in music.

|-
| style="text-align:center;"| 2004 || Iron Maiden || Special Achievement Award ||

Online Music Awards Germany
Online Music Awards Germany is a prestigious award granted to the best or the most interestingly constructed websites dedicated to various forms of activity.

|-
| style="text-align:center;"| 2001 || Iron Maiden || Best Artist Website ||

Paiste Hall of Fame
Paiste is a Swiss musical instrument manufacturing company. It is the world's third largest manufacturer of cymbals, gongs, and metal percussion. Paiste is an Estonian and Finnish word that means "shine". Nicko McBrain was inducted into Paiste Hall of Fame.

|-
| style="text-align:center;"| 2015||Nicko McBrain || Hall of Fame Induction ||

Planet Rock Awards (The Rocks)
The band has also received ten awards from fourteen nominations at the Planet Rock Awards (The ROCKS). They're nominated and awarded in 2016, 2017, 2018, 2019, 2021 and 2022 in multiple categories. In 2022 Iron Maiden became the most awarded band among the other artists.

|-
| style="text-align:center;"| 2016 || The Book of Souls || Best International Album || 
|-
| style="text-align:center;"| 2016 || "Speed of Light" || Best British Single || 
|-
| style="text-align:center;"| 2016 || rowspan="7"| Iron Maiden || rowspan="2"| Best British Band || 
|-
| style="text-align:center;"| 2017|| 
|-
| style="text-align:center;"| 2018 ||Band of the Year || 
|-
| style="text-align:center;"| 2019 || Best Live Band || 
|-
| style="text-align:center;"| 2019 || Best British Band || 
|-
| style="text-align:center;"| 2021 || Greatest Live Band of All Time || 
|-
| style="text-align:center;"| 2021 || Euros of Rock Champions || 
|-
| style="text-align:center;"| 2022 ||"The Writing on the Wall" || Best Single||
|-
| style="text-align:center;"| 2022 ||Senjutsu ||Best Album ||
|-
| style="text-align:center;"| 2022 ||Iron Maiden||Best British Band||
|-
| style="text-align:center;"| 2022 ||Iron Maiden||Greatest Metal Band of All Time||
|-
| style="text-align:center;"| 2022 ||Iron Maiden||The Rock World Championship||

Polish Antyradio Awards 
Antyradio is a Polish radio network broadcasting all genres of rock music, although mostly broadcasting contemporary rock hits. Iron Maiden were eight times nominated and awarded in the different categories.

|-
| style="text-align:center;"| 2016|| The Book of Souls|| Album of the Year || 
|-
| style="text-align:center;"| 2016|| Iron Maiden || Band of the Year || 
|-
| style="text-align:center;"| 2016 || Bruce Dickinson || Vocalist of the Year || 
|-
| style="text-align:center;"| 2019 || Iron Maiden || Best Live Act || 
|-
| style="text-align:center;"| 2021 || Bruce Dickinson || Vocalist of the Year || 
|-
| style="text-align:center;"| 2022 || Bruce Dickinson || Vocalist of the Year || 
|-
| style="text-align:center;"| 2022 || Iron Maiden || Band of the Year || 
|-
| style="text-align:center;"| 2022 || Senjutsu|| Album of the Year ||

Public Choice International
Public Choice International was a unique honorary award given by an international audience, recognizing the number one rock act in many countries around the world.

|-
| style="text-align:center;"| 1985 || Iron Maiden || International Number One Rock Act ||

Revolver Mag. Icon
In 2010 band's mascot Eddie the Head was honoured by an American extreme rock magazine Revolver with official title "Metal Icon".

|-
| style="text-align:center;"| 2010 || Eddie the Head || Metal Icon ||

Rhythm magazine
In 2018 Nicko McBrain honoured by Rhythm magazine with the title of "Best Metal Drummer In The World".

|-
| style="text-align:center;"| 2018 || Nicko McBrain || Best Metal Drummer In The World ||

Robinsons Brewery Award
Robinsons Brewery is a family-run, regional brewery, founded in 1849 at the Unicorn Inn, Stockport, England. Iron Maiden were awarded two times so far. In 2015 they were honored with a very special Golden Disc Award in recognition of trespassing the 10 million sales threshold of Trooper Ale then in 2021 the band was awarded with a commemorative plaque for trespassing the sales of more than 30 million handcrafted beer they were involved in.

|-
| style="text-align:center;"| 2015 || Iron Maiden || Recognize of 10 mln sales || 
|-
| style="text-align:center;"| 2021 || Iron Maiden || Recognize of 30 mln sales ||

Rock Aid Armenia Award
Rock Aid Armenia, also known in earlier stages as Live Aid Armenia, was a humanitarian effort by the British music industry to raise money to help those affected by the 1988 Armenian earthquake.

|-
| style="text-align:center;"| 1990||Iron Maiden||First Charity Gold Record Award & Pledge||

Rockbjörnen
Rockbjörnen is an annual awards ceremony which takes place in Sweden. Iron Maiden have received one award.

|-
| style="text-align:center;"| 2011 || Iron Maiden || Best Hard Rock Live Act ||

Rock and Roll Hall of Fame
Rock and Roll Hall of Fame honorary induction is an annual ceremony which takes place in the United States. Iron Maiden have received the very first nomination in February 2021, 41 years after their eponymous debut album was published. The second nomination they received on 1 February 2023. Iron Maiden's souvenirs are the part of Rock and Roll Hall of Fame permanent exhibition dedicated to heavy metal music.

|-
| style="text-align:center;"| 2017|| Iron Maiden  ||R'n'R HoF Exhibition || 
|-
| style="text-align:center;"| 2021 || Iron Maiden || Hall of Fame || 
|-
| style="text-align:center;"| 2023 || Iron Maiden || Hall of Fame ||

Rock Brigade Awards
Rock Brigade was the Brazilian magazine and music portal dedicated to rock and heavy metal. Iron Maiden were nominated and awarded multiple times in magazine's annual polls.

|-
| style="text-align:center;"| 1999 || Iron Maiden || Best Live Band || 
|-
| style="text-align:center;"| 2001 || Iron Maiden || Best Live Band || 
|-
| style="text-align:center;"| 2001 || Iron Maiden || Best Band Ever || 
|-
| style="text-align:center;"| 2001 || Nicko McBrain || Best Drummer || 
|-
| style="text-align:center;"| 2001 || Dave Murray || Best Guitarist || 
|-
| style="text-align:center;"| 2001 || Adrian Smith & Janick Gers || Riff Lords || 
|-
| style="text-align:center;"| 2001 || Bruce Dickinson || Best Frontman || 
|-
| style="text-align:center;"| 2001 || Steve Harris || Best Bass Player || 
|-
| style="text-align:center;"| 2001 || Steve Harris || Best Composer || 
|-
| style="text-align:center;"| 2001 || Brave New World || Best Album || 
|-
| style="text-align:center;"| 2003 || Steve Harris || Best Bass Player || 
|-
| style="text-align:center;"| 2003|| Rock in Rio || Best DVD || 
|-
| style="text-align:center;"| 2004 || Steve Harris || Best Bass Player || 
|-
| style="text-align:center;"| 2004|| Steve Harris || Best Composer || 
|-
| style="text-align:center;"| 2004 || Dance of Death || Best Album || 
|-
| style="text-align:center;"| 2004 || Bruce Dickinson || Best Frontman || 
|-
| style="text-align:center;"| 2004|| Iron Maiden || Best Live Band || 
|-
| style="text-align:center;"| 2004 || Iron Maiden || Best Band Ever|| 
|-
| style="text-align:center;"| 2005 || Iron Maiden || Best Live Band || 
|-
| style="text-align:center;"| 2004|| Iron Maiden || Best Live Band || 
|-
| style="text-align:center;"| 2004 || Iron Maiden || Best Band Ever|| 
|-
| style="text-align:center;"| 2007|| Iron Maiden || Best Live Band || 
|-
| style="text-align:center;"| 2007|| Bruce Dickinson || Best Frontman || 
|-
| style="text-align:center;"| 2007 || Iron Maiden || Best Band Ever|| 
|-
| style="text-align:center;"| 2007 || Steve Harris || Best Bass Player|| 
|-
| style="text-align:center;"| 2007 || A Matter of Life and Death || Best Album|| 
|-
| style="text-align:center;"| 2009|| Iron Maiden || Best Live Band || 
|-
| style="text-align:center;"| 2009|| Iron Maiden || Best Band Ever || 
|-
| style="text-align:center;"| 2009|| Bruce Dickinson || Best Frontman || 
|-
| style="text-align:center;"| 2010|| Iron Maiden || Rock Icon || 
|-
| style="text-align:center;"| 2010|| Bruce Dickinson || Best Frontman || 
|-
| style="text-align:center;"| 2011|| Bruce Dickinson || Best Frontman || 
|-
| style="text-align:center;"| 2011|| Iron Maiden || Best Band || 
|-
| style="text-align:center;"| 2011|| The Final Frontier || Best Album || 
|-
| style="text-align:center;"| 2013|| Iron Maiden || Best Band || 
|-
| style="text-align:center;"| 2014|| Iron Maiden || Best Band Live ||

Rock Hard France Awards
Rock Hard magazine awards were annual. Iron Maiden were nominated and awarded multiple times.

|-
| style="text-align:center;"| 1995 || The X Factor || Best Album 1995 ||

Rock Hard Germany Awards
Rock Hard magazine awards were annual. Iron Maiden were nominated and awarded multiple times.

|-
| style="text-align:center;"| 1995 || The X Factor || Best Album 1995 || 
|-
| style="text-align:center;"|1999 || Iron Maiden || Best Live Band || 
|-
| style="text-align:center;"|2002 || Iron Maiden || Best Band Ever || 
|-
| style="text-align:center;"|2003 || Iron Maiden || Best Band Ever || 
|-
| style="text-align:center;"|2003 || Rock in Rio || Best Live DVD || 
|-
| style="text-align:center;"|2004 || Iron Maiden || Best Band Ever || 
|-
| style="text-align:center;"|2005|| Eddie the Head || Metal Icon || 
|-
| style="text-align:center;"|2006|| Iron Maiden || Best Live Band || 
|-
| style="text-align:center;"|2008|| Iron Maiden || Best Live Band || 
|-
| style="text-align:center;"|2010|| Iron Maiden || Best Band Ever || 
|-
| style="text-align:center;"|2012|| Iron Maiden || Best Live Band ||

Rock Hard Spain Awards
Rock Hard magazine awards were annual. Iron Maiden were nominated and awarded multiple times.

|-
| style="text-align:center;"| 1995 || The X Factor || Best Album 1995 ||

Rock In Rio Wall of Fame
In 2017 Iron Maiden were inducted into Rock In Rio Festival Headliners Wall of Fame.

|-
| style="text-align:center;"| 2017 || Iron Maiden || Wacken Rock In Rio of Fame ||

Rock Legends Wax Museum
Rock Legends Wax Museum was built in Niagara Falls, Canada, including wax figure of Iron Maiden mascot Eddie in version known from band's second album, Killers.

|-
| style="text-align:center;"|2011||Iron Maiden's Eddie|| Rock Legends Wax Museum ||

Rolling Stone
The American magazine Rolling Stone awarded the band's seventeenth studio album "Senjutsu" with the title of Best Metal Album of 2021.

|-
| style="text-align:center;"|2021||Senjutsu|| Best Metal Album of 2021 ||

Royal Air Force (RAF UK)
The Royal Air Force (RAF) is the United Kingdom's aerial warfare force. It was formed towards the end of the First World War on 1 April 1918, becoming the first independent air force in the world, by regrouping the Royal Flying Corps (RFC) and the Royal Naval Air Service (RNAS). Bruce Dickinson was honurerd with Honorary Group Capitan RAF title.

|-
| style="text-align:center;"| 2020||Bruce Dickinson|| Honorary Group Capitan RAF ||

Royal Mail UK Honours
In January 2023 Iron Maiden were honoured by Royal Mail UK with dedicated postal stamps and cards. The band as 'bona fide' rock legends belongs to an elitarian circle of British iconic bands honoured with a unique range of stamps, including The Rolling Stones, The Beatles, Pink Floyd, Queen and Iron Maiden as the fifth one.

|-
| style="text-align:center;"| 2023 || Iron Maiden Official Stamps|| Royal Mail UK ||

Sao Paulo International Airport Honours
An Honorary Capitan Title for Bruce Dickinson.

|-
| style="text-align:center;"| 2009|| Bruce Dickinson ||Honorary Capitan Title ||

SeeYouSound Music Festival Awards
Para – documentary movie titled "Night of the Beast" won "Best Music Para – Documentary Award" at SeeYouSound Music Festival Awards 2022. 

|-
| style="text-align:center;"| 2022 || "Night of the Beast" || Best Music Para – Documentary Award ||

Silver Clef Awards
Nordoff-Robbins is a UK charity providing music therapy. They hold the annual Silver Clef Awards, from which Iron Maiden have received Silver Clef Award in 2015.

|-
| style="text-align:center;"| 2015 || Iron Maiden || 02 Silver Clef Award 2015 ||

Sklizen Awards
Sklizen Awards are the honors established by Czech Spark Magazine for the "Best Albums of the Year". Iron Maiden were awarded two times so far.
 

|-
| style="text-align:center;"| 2016 || The Book of Souls || Best Album of 2015 || 
|-
| style="text-align:center;"| 2022 || Senjutsu || Best Album of 2021 ||

Slagwerkkrant Poll Award
Nicko McBrain was awarded as "The Best Drummer in the World" in Dutch Slagwerkkrant magazine's poll vote.

|-
| style="text-align:center;"| 2021 || Iron Maiden || Best Drummer in the World Award ||

Soccer Six Music Cup
Soccer Six Music Cup was the charity event which held in Great Britain. The famous musicians and actors played the football matches to rise some money for disabled children. The Iron Maiden team was the winner two times – in 2004 and 2005. Steve Harris as the captain received the very special award called The Golden Cup.

|-
| style="text-align:center;"| 2004 || Iron Maiden Team || Golden Cup Winner || 
|-
| style="text-align:center;"| 2005 || Iron Maiden Team || Golden Cup Winner||

SpaceX HQ
In 2019 the band visited Elon Musk's SPACEX where the Key Work Area was named after them as the accolade to Iron Maiden’s legacy.

|-
| style="text-align:center;"| 2019 || Iron Maiden Team || Key Work Area Name ||

Spanish Premios Odeon Awards
Spanish Premios Odeón are considered the Spanish equivalent to the Grammy Awards. Iron Maiden's Senjutsu album received nomination in category "International Album of the Year".

|-
| style="text-align:center;"| 2022 || Senjutsu || International Album of the Year ||

Stern Pinball Champs
Stern is the name of two different but related arcade gaming companies. Stern Electronics, Inc. manufactured arcade video games and pinball machines from 1977 to 1985, and was known for 1980s Berzerk. Stern Pinball, Inc., founded in 1999 is a creator of pinball machines in North America.

|-
| style="text-align:center;"| 2020 || Iron Maiden || TWIPY Award Winner ||

Sweden Rock Award
In 2011 Iron Maiden were honoured by Sweden Rock Magazine for the best album of the decade (2000 – 2009) which was A Matter of Life and Death originally released in 2006.

|-
| style="text-align:center;"| 2011 || A Matter of Life and Death || Album of the Decade ||

SXSW Film Festival
SXSW Film Festival is a film festival that takes place every spring in Austin, Texas. Iron Maiden have received one award.

|-
| style="text-align:center;"| 2009 || Iron Maiden: Flight 666 || 24 Beats Per Second||

TAM Museu Honours
An official Comandante Do Metal title given to Bruce Dickinson.

|-
| style="text-align:center;"| 2011|| Bruce Dickinson ||Honorary Comandante Do Metal ||

Terrorizer Awards
Terrorizer was an extreme music magazine published by Dark Arts Ltd. in the United Kingdom.

|-
| style="text-align:center;"| 2008||Steve Harris|| The Best Bassist Ever ||

The BPI Hall of Fame
In 2011 Iron Maiden were inducted into BPI Hall of Fame in the UK.

|-
| style="text-align:center;"| 2011||Iron Maiden||BPI Hall of Fame||

The British Fencing Veterans
In 2022 Iron Maiden frontman – Bruce Dickinson, was named British Fencing Veterans honorary member. 

|-
| style="text-align:center;"| 2022 || Bruce Dickinson ||"BFV Honorary Member"||

The Cart and Horses Pub
The Cart and Horses Pub, located in Maryland Point, Stratford, was where Iron Maiden played some of their first shows in 1976. In 2010 the building was officially named "The Birthplace of Iron Maiden" as official museum-pub dedicated to the band's formation early years  (1975 – 1979).

|-
| style="text-align:center;"| 2010 || Iron Maiden ||"The Birthplace of Iron Maiden"||

The Heavy Music Awards
Launched in 2017, the Heavy Music Awards democratically recognise the best of the year across the heavy music landscape – artists, events, photographers, designers, producers and more. With a panel of several hundred industry insiders nominating the finalists, the public has the final say on who wins. In 2022 Heavy Metal TruAnts including Iron Maiden management were the recipients of H Award. 

|-
| style="text-align:center;"| 2022|| HM The TruAnts || H Award ||

The Pollstar Awards
Pollstar was founded in 1981, Freson/CA as a trade publication that covers the concert industry in the United States and internationally. Pollstar Awards are the annual award ceremony honoring artists and professionals in the music industry. Iron Maiden and their agents was multiple nominated for Pollstar Awards.

|-
| style="text-align:center;"| 2009|| Somewhere Back in Time World Tour || Best Rock Tour || 
|-
| style="text-align:center;"| 2014|| Maiden England World Tour || Best Rock Tour || 
|-
| style="text-align:center;"| 2019|| Iron Maiden || Best Alternative Artist || 
|-
| style="text-align:center;"| 2020|| Legacy of the Beast World Tour || Best Rock Tour || 
|-
| style="text-align:center;"| 2023|| Iron Maiden || The Per Cap Award ||

The Sixth April Award 
The Sixth of April Sarajevo Award (Bosnian: Šestoaprilska nagrada grada Sarajeva / Šestotravanjska nagrada grada Sarajeva – Шестоаприлска награда града Сарајева) is the highest decoration given by the city of Sarajevo. Recipients are awarded for their achievements in the fields of science, business, education, technology, health care, art, among many others. Iron Maiden frontman was awarded in 2019.

|-
| style="text-align:center;"| 2019 ||Bruce Dickinson|| Sixth of April Sarajevo Award ||

The Sun Bizarre Award
The Sun is a British tabloid newspaper. Iron Maiden were awarded in 1990 as "No. 1 Bizzare Star".

|-
| style="text-align:center;"| 1990||Iron Maiden|| No. 1 Star ||

Ticketmaster Brasil Award
A very special award in category The Best Tour of a Year given to Iron Maiden.

|-
| style="text-align:center;"| 2009|| Iron Maiden || The Best Tour of a Year ||

TOP Blog Award
In 2011 official Brasilian music blog dedicated to British formation was awarded with Golden Medal and entitled "The Best Music Blog of the Year".

|-
| style="text-align:center;"| 2011 || Iron Maiden Brasil || Golden Medal ||

TOP.HR Music Awards
Senjutsu album was honored with the Top.HR Music Awards by The Croatian Discography Association and the Croatian branch of RTL in the "Bestselling International Album" category. The Top.HR Music Awards has been presented since 2020 and is the local equivalent of the Grammy.

|-
| style="text-align:center;"| 2022 || Senjutsu || Bestselling International Album ||

TWIPY Awards
TWIPY are the weekly updates on what is happening in the pinball world, including new games/rumors, production and coding updates, results from competition. Iron Maiden game called Legacy of the Beast was awarded in for categories of TWIPY Awards.

|-
| style="text-align:center;"| 2019 || Legacy of the Beast ||Best Game|| 
|-
| style="text-align:center;"| 2019|| Legacy of the Beast || Best Soundtrack & Effects || 
|-
| style="text-align:center;"| 2019 || Legacy of the Beast || Best Pinball || 
|-
| style="text-align:center;"| 2019 || Legacy of the Beast || Best Gameplay & Layout ||

UK Music Video Awards
The UK Music Video Awards is an annual celebration of creativity, technical excellence and innovation in music video and moving image for music.

|-
| style="text-align:center;"| 2021 || "The Writing on the Wall" ||Best Animation in a Video ||

UK's National Fencing Team
Bruce Dickinson was a member of National Fencing Team back in the second half of the 1980s. He was placed 7th in the UK's National Fencers Ranking.

|-
| style="text-align:center;"| 1987 ||Bruce Dickinson|| NFT No. 7 ||

Universidade Federal do Triângulo
Venezuelan variety of lichens officially named  after band's frontman: Clusia dickinsoniana J.E. Nascim.

|-
| style="text-align:center;"| 2019|| Bruce Dickinson ||Clusia dickinsoniana J.E. Nascim||

University of Helsinki HD
An honorary degree is an academic degree for which a university (or other degree-awarding institution) has waived all of the usual requirements, such as matriculation, attendance, course credits, a dissertation, and the passing of comprehensive examinations. It is also known by the Latin phrases honoris causa ("for the sake of the honour") or ad honorem ("to the honour"). The degree is typically a doctorate or, less commonly, a master's degree, and may be awarded to someone who has no prior connection with the academic institution

|-
| style="text-align:center;"| 2019||Bruce Dickinson ||Honorary Doctor of Philosophy||

University of Queen Mary HD
An honorary degree is an academic degree for which a university (or other degree-awarding institution) has waived all of the usual requirements, such as matriculation, attendance, course credits, a dissertation, and the passing of comprehensive examinations. It is also known by the Latin phrases honoris causa ("for the sake of the honour") or ad honorem ("to the honour"). The degree is typically a doctorate or, less commonly, a master's degree, and may be awarded to someone who has no prior connection with the academic institution

|-
| style="text-align:center;"|2011||Bruce Dickinson|| Honorary Doctor of Music ||

US Navy Seals Award
In 2016 Iron Maiden's drummer Nicko McBrain was honoured with a special award by the US Navy Seals. McBrain has helped raising funds for the Navy Seals and supported the institution many times in his lifetime. 

|-
| style="text-align:center;"|2016||Nicko McBrain|| US Navy Seals Award ||

Vodafone Live Music Awards
Iron Maiden were nominated in the Best Live Return category at the Vodafone Live Music Awards, to which the band disagreed with their nomination and asked to be withdrawn, stating that they were "not quite sure where we are returning from". Nomination and eventually award rejected by the band's management.

|-
| style="text-align:center;"| 2008 || Iron Maiden || Best Live Return||

Wacken Festival Award
Iron Maiden received multiple Wacken Festival Relief Award.

|-
| style="text-align:center;"| 2008 || Iron Maiden || Wacken Relief Award|| 
|-
| style="text-align:center;"| 2010 || Iron Maiden || Wacken Relief Award|| 
|-
| style="text-align:center;"| 2016 || Iron Maiden || Wacken Relief Award||

Wacken Hall & Wall of Fame
In 2016 Iron Maiden were inducted into Wacken Open Air Headliners Wall of Fame. Since 2018 band mascot called Eddie the Head became a part of permanent exhibition of Wacken Hall of Fame.

|-
| style="text-align:center;"| 2016 || Iron Maiden || Wacken Wall of Fame || 
|-
| style="text-align:center;"| 2018 || Eddie the Head || Wacken Hall of Fame ||

WCJU
Band's seventeenth studio album Senjutsu took the top honours on WCJU's "Metal on Metal" listener poll.

|-
| style="text-align:center;"| 2022 || Senjutsu || Best Metal Album of 2021  ||

Wizard Productions Award
In 2013 Wizard Productions awarded the band for sold out German leg of Maiden England World Tour including six shows attended by 125,000 fans combined.

|-
| style="text-align:center;"| 2013 || Iron Maiden || Sales Recognition Award||

Yell UK Web Awards
Yell UK Web Awards is a special award granted to the best or the most interestingly constructed websites dedicated to various forms of activity.

|-
| style="text-align:center;"| 1999 || Iron Maiden || Best Entertainment Website ||

ZAiKS Awards 
Iron Maiden were awarded with Golden Disc Relief by Polish ZAiKS Society of Authors for the first ever Polish Gold DVD Certificate.

|-
| style="text-align:center;"| 2003 || Rock in Rio || First Ever Gold DVD Award ||

Žebřík Music Awards 
Particular musicians and Iron Maiden as the band were 60 times nominated to Žebřík Music Awards in the last 30 years. They have won ten times so far. Žebřík Music Awards are the most popular music honors established in Czech Republic in 1992. In 2022 their seventeenth studio album were nominated to Czech's Žebřík Music Awards in categories "International Album of the Year", "International Band of the Year" and "Video of the Year". The band's musicians were awarded nine times so far.

|-
| style="text-align:center;"| 1992 || Iron Maiden || Best International Band || 
|-
| style="text-align:center;"| 1992 || Fear of the Dark || Best International Album || 
|-
| style="text-align:center;"| 1992 || "Be Quick or Be Dead" || Best International Video || 
|-
| style="text-align:center;"| 1992 || Bruce Dickinson || Best International Singer || 
|-
| style="text-align:center;"| 1992 || Steve Harris || Best International Musician || 
|-
| style="text-align:center;"| 1993 || Iron Maiden || Best International Band || 
|-
| style="text-align:center;"| 1993 || "Fear of the Dark - Live" || Best International Video || 
|-
| style="text-align:center;"| 1993 || Bruce Dickinson || Best International Singer || 
|-
| style="text-align:center;"| 1993 || Nicko McBrain || Best International Drummer || 
|-
| style="text-align:center;"| 1993 || Iron Maiden || Best International Průser || 
|-
| style="text-align:center;"| 1993 || Iron Maiden || Best International Show || 
|-
| style="text-align:center;"| 1993 || Bruce Dickinson || Best International Persona || 
|-
| style="text-align:center;"| 1993 || Steve Harris || Best International Musician || 
|-
| style="text-align:center;"| 1994 || "Tears of the Dragon" || Best International Song || 
|-
| style="text-align:center;"| 1994 || "Tears of the Dragon" || Best International Video || 
|-
| style="text-align:center;"| 1994 || Bruce Dickinson || Best International Singer || 
|-
| style="text-align:center;"| 1994 || Balls to Picasso || Best International Album || 
|-
| style="text-align:center;"| 1994 || Iron Maiden || Best International Průser || 
|-
| style="text-align:center;"| 1994 || Bruce Dickinson || Best International Persona || 
|-
| style="text-align:center;"| 1994 || Steve Harris || Best International Musician|| 
|-
| style="text-align:center;"| 1995 || Iron Maiden || Best International Band || 
|-
| style="text-align:center;"| 1995 || The X-Factor || Best International Album || 
|-
| style="text-align:center;"| 1995 || "Man on the Edge" || Best International Song || 
|-
| style="text-align:center;"| 1995 || "Man on the Edge" || Best International Video || 
|-
| style="text-align:center;"| 1995 || Bruce Dickinson || Best International Singer || 
|-
| style="text-align:center;"| 1995 || Iron Maiden || Best International Průser || 
|-
| style="text-align:center;"| 1995 || Iron Maiden || Best International Surprise || 
|-
| style="text-align:center;"| 1995 || Iron Maiden || Best International Show || 
|-
| style="text-align:center;"| 1995 || Nicko McBrain || Best International Drummer || 
|-
| style="text-align:center;"| 1995 || Steve Harris || Best International Musician || 
|-
| style="text-align:center;"| 1995 || Bruce Dickinson || Best International Persona || 
|-
| style="text-align:center;"| 1996 || Iron Maiden || Best International Band || 
|-
| style="text-align:center;"| 1996 || Bruce Dickinson || Best International Singer || 
|-
| style="text-align:center;"| 1996 || Iron Maiden || Best International Průser || 
|-
| style="text-align:center;"| 1996 || Iron Maiden || Best International Surprise || 
|-
| style="text-align:center;"| 1996 || Iron Maiden || Best International Show || 
|-
| style="text-align:center;"| 1996 || Steve Harris || Best International Musician || 
|-
| style="text-align:center;"| 1996 || Bruce Dickinson || Best International Persona || 
|-
| style="text-align:center;"| 1997 || Bruce Dickinson || Best International Singer || 
|-
| style="text-align:center;"| 1999 || Iron Maiden || Best International Surprise || 
|-
| style="text-align:center;"| 2000 || Iron Maiden || Best International Band || 
|-
| style="text-align:center;"| 2000 || Bruce Dickinson || Best International Singer || 
|-
| style="text-align:center;"| 2000 || Brave New World || Best International Album || 
|-
| style="text-align:center;"| 2000 || "The Wicker Man" || Best International Song || 
|-
| style="text-align:center;"| 2000 || "The Wicker Man" || Best International Video || 
|-
| style="text-align:center;"| 2006 || Iron Maiden || Best International Band || 
|-
| style="text-align:center;"| 2006 || Bruce Dickinson || Best International Singer || 
|-
| style="text-align:center;"| 2006 || A Matter of Life and Death || Best International Album || 
|-
| style="text-align:center;"| 2006 || "The Different World" || Best International Video || 
|-
| style="text-align:center;"| 2008 || Bruce Dickinson || Best International Singer || 
|-
| style="text-align:center;"| 2008 || "Live After Death" || Best International DVD || 
|-
| style="text-align:center;"| 2009 || "Flight 666" || Best International DVD || 
|-
| style="text-align:center;"| 2010 || Iron Maiden || Best International Band || 
|-
| style="text-align:center;"| 2010 || Bruce Dickinson || Best International Singer || 
|-
| style="text-align:center;"| 2010 || The Final Frontier || Best International Album || 
|-
| style="text-align:center;"| 2010 || "The Final Frontier" || Best International Video || 
|-
| style="text-align:center;"| 2017 || Bruce Dickinson || Best International Singer || 
|-
| style="text-align:center;"| 2022 || Iron Maiden || Best International Band || 
|-
| style="text-align:center;"| 2022 || Bruce Dickinson || Best International Singer || 
|-
| style="text-align:center;"| 2022 || Senjutsu || Best International Album || 
|-
| style="text-align:center;"| 2022 || "The Writing on the Wall" || Best International Video ||

Miscellaneous

References

External links
 Iron Maiden's official website

Awards
Lists of awards received by British musician
Lists of awards received by musical group